Alaçalı, also known as Kılcan, is a village in the Karkamış District, Gaziantep Province, Turkey. The village is inhabited by Turkmens of the Barak tribe and had a population of 247 in 2022.

References

Villages in Karkamış District